This is a list of crime films released in 1995.

References

1995